The Calumet Montana Refining is an oil refinery located in Great Falls, Montana. The refinery is currently owned and operated by Calumet Specialty Products Partners, L.P.

See also
List of oil refineries

References

External links
 Calument Specialty website

Energy infrastructure in Montana
Buildings and structures in Great Falls, Montana
Oil refineries in the United States